Bommai ministry may refer to:

Karnataka Council of Ministers 
 S. R. Bommai ministry, the government of Karnataka headed by S. R. Bommai from 1988 to 1989
 Basavaraj Bommai ministry, the government of Karnataka headed by Basavaraj Bommai from 2021 onwards

See also
S. R. Bommai
Basavaraj Bommai